The Kilomètre vertical de Fully is an international skyrunning competition held for the first time in 2001. It runs every year in July in Fully (Switzerland) and is valid for the Vertical Kilometer World Circuit.

Editions

See also 
 Vertical Kilometer World Circuit
 Skyrunner World Series

References

External links 
 Official web site

Skyrunning competitions
Skyrunner World Series
Vertical kilometer running competitions
Athletics competitions in Switzerland
Sport in Valais